Amy Morrison is an actress.

Amy Morrison may also refer to:

Amy Morrison, character in Alex in Wonderland
Amy Morrison (soccer), player for Butler Bulldogs women's soccer